Ira Martin Millstein is an American antitrust lawyer, professor, and author. He is a senior partner at Weil, Gotshal & Manges and the longest-practicing partner in big law, according to Reuters.

Biography 
Millstein graduated from Bronx High School of Science in 1943. He graduated from Columbia School of Engineering and Applied Science in 1947 and received a J.D. degree from Columbia Law School in 1949.

He joined Weil, Gotshal & Manges in 1951 and remained in the firm ever since, celebrating his 70th anniversary in the firm in 2021. During his tenure at Weil, he has counseled the boards of General Motors, General Electric, Westinghouse Electric Corporation, WellChoice, The Walt Disney Company, among others. He also played a role in New York's financial rescue during its fiscal crisis in the 1970s. Wall Street Journal describes him as one of Wall Street's most powerful lawyers.

He has served as chairman of the antitrust law section of both the American Bar Association as well as the New York State Bar Association. He was also appointed by governor George Pataki to chair a commission that led to the 2009 Public Authorities Reform Act of New York state. He is also a close friend of Ruth Bader Ginsburg, brokering a meeting between Ginsburg and Senator Orrin Hatch that eased her way to a judgeship on the D.C. Circuit.

A proponent of stakeholder capitalism, he helped the Business Roundtable draft its Statement on Corporate Responsibility 1981. He also chaired several OECD initiatives and advisory groups on improving corporate governance standards in member countries. He was called, by Institutional Investor, "éminence grise of corporate governance and prime mover of the OECD governance codes."

He is also the founding chair of The Millstein Center for Global Markets and Corporate Ownership at Columbia Law School, which explores how corporate governance should adapt to the changing social norms and pressures. He was a senior associate dean of corporate governance at Yale School of Management.

Millstein was elected a fellow of the American Academy of Arts and Sciences in 1995.

From 1991 to 2000, he was the chairman of the Central Park Conservancy and remains a life trustee. He is also a board member of the National September 11 Memorial & Museum. He was elected chairman of the board of trustees of the Albert Einstein College of Medicine in 2004.

Personal life 
He was married to Diane G. Millstein, a city planner who helped Greenwich, Connecticut establish its zoning, until her death in 2010. In 2013, Millstein married Susan Marie Frame. The couple lived in 930 Fifth Avenue.

References 

20th-century American lawyers
21st-century American lawyers
Columbia School of Engineering and Applied Science alumni
Columbia Law School alumni
The Bronx High School of Science alumni
Antitrust lawyers
Lawyers from New York City
Fellows of the American Academy of Arts and Sciences